Vitsada is a village in the Famagusta District of Cyprus, located 4 km northeast of Marathovounos. It is under the de facto control of Northern Cyprus.

References

Communities in Famagusta District
Populated places in Gazimağusa District